The 1942 Chico State Wildcats football team represented Chico State College—now known as California State University, Chico—as a member of the Far Western Conference (FWC) during the 1942 college football season. Led by fourth-year head coach Roy Bohler, Chico State compiled an overall record of 5–1 with a mark of 1–1 in conference play, placing second in the FWC. The team outscored its opponents 95 to 45 for the season. The Wildcats played home games at College Field in Chico, California.

Schedule

References

Chico State
Chico State Wildcats football seasons
Chico State Wildcats football